KBNP (1410 AM, "The Money Station") is a commercial radio station in Portland, Oregon. The station is licensed to KBNP Radio, Inc., and is owned by the Second Amendment Foundation and Citizens Committee for the Right to Keep and Bear Arms, with radio studios on S.W. Arthur Street.  It has a radio format of financial news and syndicated conservative talk shows.

By day, KBNP is powered at 5,000 watts non-directional.  But to protect other stations on 1410 AM at night, when radio waves travel farther, KBNP greatly reduces power to 9 watts.  The transmitter is of S.E. Parks Way near the Willamette River.

History
On , the station first signed on the air. Its original call sign was KPAM. From 1960 to 1970, there was also a KPFM at 97.1mHz. On February 27, 1970, KPFM changed its call sign to KPAM-FM. KPAM-AM-FM ran a Top 40 format as "K-Pam." In 1980, Duffy Broadcasting acquired KPAM-AM-FM. In September of that year, KPAM-AM-FM changed to KCNR and KCNR-FM, as the "Center" of the FM dial. The two stations aired an adult contemporary format. From 1968-1988 the station had the KKUL call letters. (The KPAM call letters are still in the Portland market on 860 AM.)

In March 2009, Alan M. Gottlieb applied to transfer control of KBNP Radio, Inc., the licensee of record for this radio station, to the Second Amendment Foundation and the Citizens Committee for the Right to Keep and Bear Arms, both of Bellevue, Washington.  The transfer was approved by the FCC on March 27, 2009.

References

External links
KBNP official website
Second Amendment Foundation

FCC History Cards for KBNP

BNP
Business talk radio stations
Radio stations established in 1951
1951 establishments in Oregon
Business mass media in the United States